The 2022 FIG World Cup circuit in Artistic Gymnastics is a series of competitions officially organized and promoted by the International Gymnastics Federation (FIG) in 2022.  Due to the 2022 Russian invasion of Ukraine, the International Gymnastics Federation implemented restrictions regarding the use of Russian and Belarusian anthems and flags for the competitions in Cottbus and Doha.  Starting March 7, the FIG banned Russian and Belarusian athletes and officials from taking part in FIG-sanctioned competitions.

Schedule

World Cup series

World Challenge Cup series

Medalists

Men

World Cup series

2022 World Cup series winners

World Challenge Cup series

2022 World Challenge Cup series winners

Women

World Cup series

2022 World Cup series winners

World Challenge Cup series

2022 World Challenge Cup series winners

Controversy
On February 24, the first day of competition at the Cottbus World Cup, Russia launched a full-scale invasion of Ukraine.  While no Russians competed in Cottbus, some competed at the following World Cup in Doha alongside Ukrainian athletes.  During the medal ceremony for the parallel bars Russian gymnast and bronze medalist Ivan Kuliak wore a Z on his chest – a military symbol and a sign of support for Russia's invasion of Ukraine – despite sharing a podium with gold medalist Illia Kovtun, a Ukrainian athlete, and Kazakh gymnast and silver medalist Milad Karimi who lives and trains in Ukraine.  The FIG announced that it will ask the Gymnastics Ethics Foundation to open disciplinary proceedings against Kuliak.  The day before the incident the FIG announced that starting March 7 Russian and Belarusian athletes would be banned from participating in FIG-sanctioned competitions.

The FIG sanctioned Kuliak with a one-year ban, ending May 17, 2023 or six months after the ban on Russian athletes is lifted and ruled that he is to be stripped of his bronze medal and prize money.

See also
 2022 FIG Rhythmic Gymnastics World Cup series

References

FIG Artistic Gymnastics World Cup Series, 2022
Artistic Gymnastics World Cup
Sports events affected by the 2022 Russian invasion of Ukraine